Subterfuge is a 1968 British Eurospy espionage film directed by Peter Graham Scott and starring Gene Barry, Joan Collins and Richard Todd.

Synopsis
A young wife is becoming very distraught over the fact that her husband, a secret service "spy" for Britain, has changed his mind about transferring away so that he can spend more time with her and their young son. He has grown cold and distant towards her; she thinks it's because of the secretiveness of his work. Meanwhile, a U.S spy comes to Britain and is induced to help the British "team" with an undercover spy ring.

Cast

Critical reception
In the Radio Times, David McGillivray wrote, "despite endless double-crossing and a kidnapping, this is low on excitement and lacks a strong villain. With most of London's landmarks included along the way, it might appeal to the odd tourist. The presence of Joan Collins, dressed up to the nines, adds a bit of glamour."

References

External links
 

1968 films
1960s spy films
British spy films
Films directed by Peter Graham Scott
Films set in England
Films set in London
Films shot in London
Films set on the London Underground
1960s English-language films
1960s British films